Salif Keïta Traoré (born 8 December 1946), known as Keita, is a Malian retired footballer who played as a striker.

Club career
Keita was born in Bamako, playing in his country for AS Real Bamako and Stade Malien. With the former, which he represented in two different spells, he was always crowned Première Division champion.

In 1967, 20-year-old Keita left for France to join AS Saint-Étienne, where he won three consecutive Ligue 1 titles, including the double in 1968 and 1970. In his last two seasons with Les Verts combined, he scored an astonishing 71 league goals – 42 alone in the 1970–71 campaign – but the team failed to win any silverware; in 1970, he was voted African Footballer of the Year.

Keita joined fellow league side Olympique de Marseille in the 1972 summer. After the club tried to force him to assume French nationality he opposed, leaving in the ensuing off-season for Valencia CF in Spain.

Spanish newspapers were accused of racism when one headline read El Valencia va a por alemanes y vuelve con un negro ("Valencia goes out to buy Germans and comes back with a black man"), but he was always loved during his spell at the club, netting in his debut with the Che, a 2–1 La Liga home win against Real Oviedo, and being eventually nicknamed La perla negra de Malí (The black pearl of Mali); he complained, however, that he was constantly played out of position.

In 1976, after three years with Valencia, Keita signed for Sporting Clube de Portugal, where he replaced another legendary goalscorer, Héctor Yazalde. In two of his three seasons with the Lisbon side he scored in double digits, winning one domestic cup. He retired at the age of 34, after a couple of years with the New England Tea Men in the United States.

International career
In 1963, at the age of only 16, Keita was selected to play for Mali. He was part of the squad that appeared at the 1972 African Cup of Nations in Cameroon, helping the national team finish second.

In June 2005, Keita was elected president of the Malian Football Federation for a period of four years. Late into the following year, he was selected by the Confederation of African Football as one of the best 200 African football players of the last 50 years.

Career statistics

Club

Personal life
Keita's nephew, Seydou Keita, was also a footballer. He also played some years in France, and later represented, with great team and individual success, FC Barcelona. Mohamed Sissoko, who played namely for Valencia, Liverpool and Juventus FC, was also his nephew; both played similar roles as central midfielders; another nephew, Sidi Yaya Keita, was also a footballer and a midfielder, who played most of his career in France with RC Lens.

Guinean film director Cheik Doukouré used the life of Keita as a starting point for his 1994 work Le Ballon d'or. In 1994, he created the first training center for professional football players in Mali, which bore his name.

From 2007, Keita acted as delegated minister of the Prime Minister of Mali.

Honours
Real Bamako
Malian Cup: 1963–64, 1965–66, 1966–67
African Cup of Champions Clubs: runner-up 1966

Stade Malien
African Cup of Champions Clubs: runner-up 1965

Saint-Étienne
Ligue 1: 1967–68, 1968–69, 1969–70; runner-up 1970–71
Coupe de France: 1967–68, 1969–70
Trophée des Champions: 1967, 1968, 1969

Sporting CP
Primeira Liga: Runner-up 1976–77
Taça de Portugal: 1977–78; runner-up 1978–79

Mali
African Games: runner-up 1965
Africa Cup of Nations: runner-up 1972

Individual
African Cup of Champions Clubs: Best goalscorer 1965, 1966
African Footballer of the Year: 1970

Decorations
FIFA Order of Merit: 1996

References

External links
OM profile 

NASL stats

1946 births
Living people
Sportspeople from Bamako
Malian footballers
Association football forwards
AS Real Bamako players
Stade Malien players
Ligue 1 players
AS Saint-Étienne players
Olympique de Marseille players
La Liga players
Valencia CF players
Primeira Liga players
Sporting CP footballers
North American Soccer League (1968–1984) players
North American Soccer League (1968–1984) indoor players
New England Tea Men players
Mali international footballers
1972 African Cup of Nations players
Malian expatriate footballers
Expatriate footballers in France
Expatriate footballers in Spain
Expatriate footballers in Portugal
Expatriate soccer players in the United States
Malian expatriate sportspeople in France
Malian expatriate sportspeople in Spain
Malian expatriate sportspeople in Portugal
Malian expatriate sportspeople in the United States
African Footballer of the Year winners
21st-century Malian people
African Games silver medalists for Mali
African Games medalists in football
Competitors at the 1965 All-Africa Games